This is a comprehensive list of Atlético Madrid honours. Atlético have amassed 34 major titles so far in their history. These honours include the La Liga title on eleven occasions, including a league and cup double in 1996; the Copa del Rey on ten occasions; two Supercopas de España, one Copa Eva Duarte and Copa Presidente FEF (both trophies are official predecessor to the Supercopa de España). In European competition, they won the European Cup Winners' Cup in 1962, were runners-up in 1963 and 1986, were Champions League runners-up in 1974, 2014 and 2016, won the Europa League in 2010, 2012 and 2018, and won the UEFA Super Cup in 2010, 2012 and 2018. They also lifted the 1974 Intercontinental Cup.

Club honours

International competitions

 European Cup / UEFA Champions League
 Runners-up: 1973–74, 2013–14, 2015–16

 European Cup Winners' Cup
 Winners: 1961–62
 Runners-up: 1962–63, 1985–86

 Intercontinental Cup
 Winners: 1974

 UEFA Intertoto Cup
 Runners-up: 2004

 UEFA Europa League
 Winners: 2009–10, 2011–12, 2017–18

 UEFA Super Cup
 Winners: 2010, 2012, 2018

National competitions
 La Liga
 Winners (11): 1939–40, 1940–41, 1949–50, 1950–51, 1965–66, 1969–70, 1972–73, 1976–77, 1995–96, 2013–14, 2020–21

 Runners-up (10): 1943–44, 1957–58, 1960–61, 1962–63, 1964–65, 1973–74, 1984–85, 1990–91, 2017–18, 2018–19
 Copa del Rey
 Winners (10): 1959–60, 1960–61, 1964–65, 1971–72, 1975–76, 1984–85, 1990–91, 1991–92, 1995–96, 2012–13
 Runners-up (9): 1920–21, 1925–26, 1955–56, 1963–64, 1974–75, 1986–87, 1998–99, 1999–2000, 2009–10

 Supercopa de España
 Winners (2):  1985, 2014
 Runners-up (5): 1991, 1992, 1996, 2013, 2019–20

 Copa de los Campeones de España (Unofficial event prior to the Supercopa de España)
 Winners (1): 1940

Copa Presidente FEF (Official predecessor to the Supercopa de España)
 Winners (1): 1947

Copa Eva Duarte (Official predecessor to the Supercopa de España)
 Winners (1): 1951
 Runners-up (1): 1950

 Copa de la Liga
 Runners-up (2): 1984, 1985

 Segunda División
 Winners (1): 2001–02
 Runners-up (2): 1932–33, 1933-34

Regional Competitions
Campeonato Regional Centro
 Winners: 1920–21, 1924–25, 1927–28, 1939–40

Copa Federación Centro
 Winners: 1940–41

Copa Ramón Triana
 Winners: 1944–45, 1953–54, 1959–60

Friendly competitions

Copa Rodríguez Azuaga
 Winners: 1913
 	
Trofeo Corpus de Lugo	
 Winners: 1957
 
Trofeo Corpus de Cádiz	
 Winners: 1958
 	
Torneo Triangular del Metropolitano	
 Winners: 1962
 	
Copa Ciudad de São Paulo	
 Winners: 1977
 	
Mohammed V Trophy	
 Winners: 1965, 1970, 1980

Trofeo Ciudad de Ceuta
 Winners: 1982

Trofeo La Amistad de Murcia 
 Winners: 1988

Trofeo Internacional de Fútbol Ciudad de Oporto	
 Winners: 1990
 	
Iberian Cup	
 Winners: 1991
 	
Trofeo Ciudad de la Línea	
 Winners: 1983, 1989, 1992
 	
Liga de las Televisiones Autonómicas
 Winners: 1994

Trofeo Ciudad de Valladolid	
 Winners: 1992, 1995
 	
Orange Trophy	
 Winners: 1995
 	
Alicante City Trophy	
 Winners: 1996
 	
Trofeo Ciudad de Palma	
 Winners: 1996
 	
Trofeo Ciudad de Marbella	
 Winners: 1994, 1995, 1997
 
Trofeo Ciudad de Santa Cruz	
 Winners: 1997
 	
Trofeo 75 Aniversario del Club Deportivo Tenerife	
 Winners: 1997
 	
Trofeo Gelderland	
 Winners: 1998
 	
Trofeo Ciudad de Salamanca	
 Winners: 1995, 2001
 	
Trofeo Villa de Leganés	
 Winners: 2001, 2002
 	
Villa de Madrid Trophy	
 Winners: 1974, 1975, 1976, 1980, 1983, 1985, 1986, 1989, 1990, 1992, 1993, 1994, 1995, 1996, 1997, 1998, 2000, 2003
	
Copa Telefónica MoviStar	
 Winners: 2003
 	
Los Cármenes Trophy	
 Winners: 2003
 	
Trofeo Alcarria	
 Winners: 2003
 	
Trofeo Madrid 2012	
 Winners: 2003
 	
Trofeo Hellboy	
 Winners: 2004
 	
Trofeo Ciudad de Zaragoza	
 Winners: 2004
 	
Trofeo Ibérico	
 Winners: 1980, 1981, 2005
 	
Trofeo Ciudad de Santander	
 Winners: 2005
	
Trofeo Ciudad de Las Palmas de Gran Canaria	
 Winners: 2005
 	
Shanghai International Football Tournament	
 Winners: 2006
 	
The City of Vigo Trophy	
Winners: 2007
 	
Trofeo Cervantes	
 Winners: 1978, 1989, 2008
 	
Trofeo Teresa Rivero	
 Winners: 2008

Trofeo Camino Real
 Winners: 2008
 	
Teresa Herrera Trophy	
 Winners: 1956, 1965, 1973, 1985, 1986, 2009
	
Trofeo Colombino	
 Winners: 1966, 1972, 1991, 1993, 2011
 	
Trofeo Villa de Fuenlabrada	
 Winners: 2011

Copa Colombia & Copa Neiva
 Winners: 2012
 	
Peter Lim Charity Cup	
 Winners: 2013
 	
Trofeo DirecTV de la Copa EuroAmericana	
 Winners: 2013–VII, 2013–VIII, 2014–V
 	
Ramón de Carranza Trophy
 Winners: 1968, 1976, 1977, 1978, 1991, 1995, 1997, 2003, 2014, 2015
 	
HKFC Soccer Sevens 	
 Winners: 2015

Wanda International Football Tournament
 Winners: 2015
 	
Audi Cup 	
 Winners: 2017

Jesús Gil & Gil Trophy
 Winners: 2006, 2013, 2014, 2015, 2016, 2019
 	
MLS All-Star Game	
 Winners: 2019

Awards & recognitions
Trofeo Martini & Rossi: 1950–51
Copa Stadium: 1962  
Gold Medal from the Community of Madrid & City Council of Madrid: 2003 
Special mention award with extraordinary character from the Madrid Football Federation: 2012 
Award at XXXIII National Sports Gala: 2012 
Challenge Samaranch Award, at the Grand Mundo Deportivo Gala: 2013 
Orange and Lemon Awards: 2013 
Illustrated Avenue Award for the club's international expansion: 2013 
Laurel Platinum Awards for the best sports project: 2013–2014 
Award at XXXV National Sports Gala of the Spanish Sports Press Association (AEPD): 2014 
IFFHS The World's Club Team of the Month: August 2011, April 2014
Gold Plate of the Royal Order of Sporting Merit: 2014 
Globe Soccer Special Award: 2014 
Globe Soccer Best Club of the Year: 2012, 2018
IFFHS The World's Club Team of the Year: 2018

Individual honours

Pichichi Trophy
 Pruden: 1940–41 (33 goals)
 José Eulogio Gárate: 1968–69 (14 goals), 1969–70 (16 goals), 1970–71 (17 goals)
 Luis Aragonés: 1969–70 (16 goals)
 Hugo Sánchez: 1984–85 (19 goals)
 Baltazar: 1988–89 (35 goals)
 Manolo: 1991–92 (27 goals)
 Christian Vieri: 1997–98 (24 goals)
 Diego Forlán: 2008–09 (32 goals) also won the European Golden Shoe

Zamora Trophy
 Fernando Tabales: 1939–40
 Marcel Domingo: 1948–49
 Miguel Reina: 1976–77
 Abel Resino: 1990–91
 José Francisco Molina: 1995–96
 Thibaut Courtois: 2012–13, 2013–14
 Jan Oblak: 2015–16, 2016–17, 2017–18, 2018–19, 2020–21

References

External links
Club official titles website
Pichichi, a history of the award and up to date Pichichi standings
CIHEFE - List of Zamora winner 

Honours
Atletico
Honours